Manjulata Mandal is an Indian politician. She was elected to the Lok Sabha, the lower house of the Parliament of India, from Bhadrak, Odisha, in the 2019 Indian general election, as a member of the Biju Janata Dal.

References

External links

 Official biographical sketch in Parliament of India website

Living people
India MPs 2019–present
Lok Sabha members from Odisha
Biju Janata Dal politicians
1976 births